Anthony "Tony" Burreket (born 6 July 1934) is a former Australian politician.

He was born in Paddington in Sydney. His father was Abraham Burreket, a bootmaker. His parents died in 1937 and he lived in an orphanage until 1948. Self-educated, he matriculated with honours from Victoria Correspondence School and gained a primary teachers' certificate from Frankston Teachers College. He joined the Australian Army in 1951 and served in Borneo and Malaysia in 1964 and 1965. He retired as an education officer in the Army in 1972 and became a real estate agent and developer. A member of the National Party, he was elected to Townsville City Council in 1985, serving until 1988. In 1986 he was elected to the Queensland Legislative Assembly as the member for Townsville, serving as a backbencher until his defeat in 1989.

References

1934 births
Living people
National Party of Australia members of the Parliament of Queensland
Members of the Queensland Legislative Assembly